Tipton, Illinois may refer to:
Tipton, Champaign County, Illinois, an unincorporated community in Champaign County
Tipton, Monroe County, Illinois, an unincorporated community in Monroe County